WAPI is an abbreviation for workflow APIs and interchange formats, published by the Workflow Management Coalition, and incorporating specifications to enable interoperability between different components of workflow management systems and
applications.

WAPI includes:
 A range of API calls to support functions between a workflow engine and applications or other system components
 Interchange formats and protocols to support interoperability between different workflow engines
 Formats for the exchange of information such as process definitions and audit data between a workflow engine and other external repositories.

Synonyms 
 Workflow APIs
 Workflow management system APIs

References

Workflow technology